Siberia is Polvo's sixth studio album. It was released on Merge Records on September 30, 2013. Unlike its predecessor, 2009's In Prism, the album was not accompanied with a tour.

An official music video was created for the track "Light, Raking."

Reception 
Siberia, like its predecessor, received universal critical acclaim, with a Metacritic score of 81/100 based on 12 reviews. In a highly positive review, Stuart Berman of Pitchfork noted that the band's "subtle classic-rock quotes—like the “Tom Sawyer”-worthy arpeggio that underpins the tranquil “Changed”—serve to make Polvo’s complex guitarchitecture more inviting to the uninitiated" & praised "Ash Bowie and Dave Brylawski’s more emotionally revelatory approach to their vocals." Fred Thomas of AllMusic called the album "a step up from Polvo's original return to the scene. Though the songs here would have fit in with the best of their earlier phases, they manage to inject deeper subtleties and emotional crosscurrents than even their best work from the '90s without getting too soft in the process."

Sean Kirkpatrick of The Paper Chase-fame ranked Siberia his 2nd favorite album of the year. Radical Dads included it among their favorite albums of 2013. Pharaoh Overlord picked the track "Total Immersion" as one of their favorites, calling it "[p]erfectly twisted progressive pop music. All these years I’ve admired Polvo’s exceptional arrangements. I just wonder how some musicians can be so advanced. Music like this cannot be made alone, this needs a collective mind."

Accolades

Track listing
"Total Immersion" - 6:26
"Blues is Loss" - 6:52
"Light, Raking" - 4:31
"Changed" - 3:24
"The Water Wheel" - 7:57
"Old Maps" - 4:11
"Some Songs" - 5:32
"Anchoress" - 6:12

Credits 
Polvo are credited as the primary artist. The remainder of the credits have been adapted from AllMusic:

References

Polvo albums
2013 albums